The Valea Rea is a left tributary of the Tărățel in Gorj County, Romania. It flows into the Tărățel in Pojogeni.

References

Rivers of Romania
Rivers of Gorj County